KJOR (104.1 FM) is a radio station broadcasting a Classic Regional Mexican and Ranchera music radio format. Licensed to Windsor, California, United States, it serves the Santa Rosa area.  The station is currently owned by Lazer Licenses, LLC.

History 

The station was originally KMHX and previously had a Hot AC format branded as Mix 104.1

External links

Mass media in Sonoma County, California
JOR
Windsor, California
JOR